Blue is an American drama web series created by Rodrigo García and starring Julia Stiles. The pilot episode aired on June 11, 2012. It originally aired on the WIGS channel on YouTube but eventually streamed on Hulu, Fox.com, and WIGS' own website for its third season, which takes the form of four long-form episodes lasting 40–60 minutes rather than the shorter episodes of the first two seasons.

Since its release, Blue has garnered several accolades, including a Satellite Award nomination in 2013, Art Directors Guild Award nomination for Production Design - (Myers) in 2014, and three IAWTV Awards, for Best Director – Drama (García) in 2014 and Best Actress – Drama (Stiles) in 2013 and 2014.

Plot
Blue (Julia Stiles) is a mother with a secret life as a sex worker. She’ll do anything to keep it from her son Josh (Uriah Shelton). But her past has other plans.

Cast

Main

Others

Television broadcasts

For television broadcast the series has been edited into 10 one-hour-long episodes (with the first six made up of compilations of the short-form shows), and airs on Lifetime's international channels (including the UK and Africa). The dates below correspond to their first airdates in Britain. The series premiered in the United States on LMN on July 8, 2016 under the title Blue: A Secret Life.

Each compilation is named after a line of dialogue. The webisodes are not all used in the order they were shown online.  Julia Stiles does not appear in webisodes marked with an asterisk. In the United States, LMN aired the contents of the third season over five compilation episodes titled "Call Me Francine", "Take Off Your Clothes", "A History of Anxiety", "Your Favorite Client", and "Choices".

Awards and nominations

References

External links
 
 

YouTube channels
Short film series
2010s American drama television series
2012 American television series debuts
American drama web series